U. Lakshmikandhan is an Indian politician from All India NR Congress. He was elected as a member of the Puducherry Legislative Assembly from Embalam (constituency). He defeated M. Candassamy of Indian National Congress by 2,240 votes in 2021 Puducherry Assembly election.

References 

Living people
Year of birth missing (living people)
21st-century Indian politicians
People from Puducherry
All India NR Congress politicians
Puducherry MLAs 2021–2026